Jimmy Lewthwaite (10 November 1920 – 23 December 2006), also known by the nickname of "Gentleman Jim", born in Broughton Road, Cleator Moor, Cumberland, was a rugby league  for Great Britain, England, Cumberland and Barrow.

Barrow 
With Barrow he scored a club record 351 tries and kicked 20 goals in exactly 500 appearances from 1943–57. He scored 50 tries in his last season, 1956–57, another club record. He retired after Barrow's Rugby League Challenge Cup Final defeat by Leeds in 1957, one of three Wembley appearances he made with the Cumbrian club during that decade.

Lewthwaite's Testimonial match at Barrow took place in 1956.

He was inducted into the club's Hall of Fame when it was launched in 2001, alongside 1950s teammates Phil Jackson and Willie Horne.

International 
On the international front he travelled to Australasia with Great Britain in 1946 – the famous "Indomitables" tour, named after the vessel on which they sailed, . He top-scored with 25 tries on that tour despite not making the Test team. He also won one England cap.

County honours
Jimmy Lewthwaite represented Cumberland. Jimmy Lewthwaite played , i.e. number 2, in Cumberland's 5-4 victory over Australia in the 1948–49 Kangaroo tour of Great Britain and France match at the Recreation Ground, Whitehaven on Wednesday 13 October 1948, in front of a crowd of 8,818.

Challenge Cup Final appearances
Jimmy Lewthwaite played , i.e. number 2, in Barrow's 0-10 defeat by Wigan in the 1951 Challenge Cup Final during the 1950–51 season at Wembley Stadium, London on Saturday 5 May 1951, played  in the 21-12 victory over Workington Town in the 1955 Challenge Cup Final during the 1954–55 season at Wembley Stadium, London on Saturday 30 April 1955, in front of a crowd of 66,513, and played  in the 7-9 defeat by Leeds in the 1957 Challenge Cup Final during the 1956–57 season at Wembley Stadium, London on Saturday 11 May 1957, in front of a crowd of 76,318.

Career records
Jimmy Lewthwaite holds Barrow's "Most Career Appearances" record with 500 appearances, and is first in Barrow's all time try scorers list with 354-tries.

Life 
He represented Cumberland at rugby union and association football as a schoolboy, as well as winning a medal in the All-England Schools Athletics competition at the age of 13. He moved to Woodley, near Reading, shortly before turning 15 to work at an aircraft factory but later relocated to Barrow to take up an apprenticeship at the town's shipyard.
He continued as a footballer and had trials with Blackburn Rovers and Preston North End before switching to rugby league with Barrow in 1943, making his first-team début against St. Helens in April that year.
He later played golf around the district.

References

External links
Statistics at rugbyleagueproject.org
(archived by web.archive.org) Back on the Wembley trail

1920 births
2006 deaths
Barrow Raiders players
Cumberland rugby league team players
England national rugby league team players
English rugby league players
Great Britain national rugby league team players
People from Cleator Moor
Rugby league players from Cumbria
Rugby league wingers
Rugby articles needing expert attention